Gustaf Malmsten (4 December 1889 – 30 March 1976) was a Swedish athlete. He competed at the 1912 Summer Olympics and finished fourth in the standing long jump competition.

References

1889 births
1976 deaths
Swedish male long jumpers
Olympic athletes of Sweden
Athletes (track and field) at the 1912 Summer Olympics
People from Eskilstuna
Sportspeople from Södermanland County
20th-century Swedish people